Kirsten Agresta Copely  is an American harpist based in New York City.  She received her Bachelor and Master of Music degrees from Indiana University Bloomington in Harp Performance.  Agresta was Bronze Medal winner in the 1989 USA International Harp Competition. She is the former Associate Professor of harp at Vanderbilt University and Affiliated Artist on the music faculty at Sarah Lawrence College.

Her debut album, Dream World was released in August 2001. "The Covers Album" was released on all streaming platforms in May 2019. The all-original, new age album "Around The Sun" released January, 2020, marking Kirsten's first as composer and winning a Silver Medal at the Global Music Awards. <ref>{{cite web |url=http://www.globalmusicawards.com | 

Agresta-Copely has performed as a solo artist throughout the United States, Europe, South America, Israel, Japan, and the South Pacific.  She made her Carnegie Hall solo recital debut in 1998 in Weill Concert Hall, returning again by popular demand in 1999, and 2002.  Agresta debuted as concerto soloist in Isaac Stern Auditorium in April, 2006 and later at Lincoln Center Avery Fisher Hall and David Geffen Hall. She has appeared in People (Magazine) "Up and Coming" column and was presented on NBC, CBS, and ABC-TV, MTV, Saturday Night Live, Late Night with David Letterman, "Late Night with Stephen Colbert" and the Today Show.

Commanding a wide range of genres, Agresta has collaborated with many hip hop, R&B, and pop icons, including Jay-Z, Beyoncé Knowles, Enya, Kanye West, Alicia Keys, Lady Antebellum, Evanescence, The Who, Carrie Underwood, Jennifer Nettles, Alan Jackson, Frank Ocean and The Roots. She is featured on the Erykah Badu album New Amerykah Part Two: Return of the Ankh on the hit single "Window Seat" and "Incense". She can also be heard on electronica/producer Bonobo's album "The North Borders", and has recorded with Kacey Musgraves, Kristin Chenoweth, The Mavericks,  Mandy Barnett, Evanescence, Lionel Richie, Sissel, Jamie Lidell and more.

She can also be heard on numerous movie soundtracks, including Outlander Season 3, "Night At The Museum: Battle of the Smithsonian", "Sex and the City 2", "Rebel in the Rye", "My Little Pony: The Movie", "Outlander: Season 3" and "The Tempest".

Agresta-Copely performed for U.S. President Barack Obama at the second official White House State Dinner (honoring Mexican President Felipe Calderón) with R&B icon Beyoncé.  She appears on "Live at Roseland: Elements of 4", a DVD of performance with Beyoncé at Roseland Ballroom in New York City. Agresta also took the stage with Jay-Z at Carnegie Hall for two performances, benefiting the United Way and the Shawn Carter Scholarship Foundation. 

She has also privately performed for officials and dignitariesincluding Queen Margrethe II of Denmark, Queen Silvia of Sweden, Queen Rania Al-Abdullah of Jordan, UN Secretary General Kofi Annan, and former U.S. Vice President Al Gore.

Agresta is a board member of the World Harp Congress, voting member of NARAS, and a member of ASCAP.

References

External links
 Official website
'Ep. 104: Kirsten Agresta Copely, harpist' Interview by Tigran Arakelyan

Sarah Lawrence College faculty
Vanderbilt University faculty
American women composers
American harpists
Living people
Indiana University Bloomington alumni
Year of birth missing (living people)